The following lists events that happened during 1883 in South Africa.

Incumbents
 Governor of the Cape of Good Hope and High Commissioner for Southern Africa: Hercules Robinson.
 Governor of the Colony of Natal: Henry Ernest Gascoyne Bulwer.
 State President of the Orange Free State: Jan Brand.
 State President of the South African Republic: Triumviate of Paul Kruger, Marthinus Wessel Pretorius and Piet Joubert (until 9 May), Paul Kruger (starting 9 May).
 Prime Minister of the Cape of Good Hope: Thomas Charles Scanlen.

Events

April
 16 – Paul Kruger is re-elected president of the Zuid-Afrikaansche Republiek.

May
 9 – Paul Kruger is sworn in as president of the Zuid-Afrikaansche Republiek.

July
 22 – Zulu King Cetshwayo barely escapes with his life in a rebel attack.

August
 6 – The United States of Stellaland is established when the Republics of Stellaland and Goshen unite.
 12 – The last Quagga in the world dies in captivity at the Artis Magistra zoo in Amsterdam, making the species extinct.

Births
 February – Z. D. Mangoaela, Basotho folklorist and writer (d. 1963)
 6 August – Constance Georgina Adams, botanist (d. 1968)

Deaths
 9 August – Robert Moffat, Scottish Congregationalist missionary. Died in Leigh near Tunbridge Wells, England.

Railways

Railway lines opened

 5 May – Cape Western – Muizenberg to Kalkbaai, .
 14 May – Cape Western – Beaufort West to Victoria West Road, .
 15 October – Cape Eastern – Queenstown to Sterkstroom, .
 16 October – Cape Midland – Cradock to Colesberg, .

Locomotives
 Eighteen 3rd Class 4-4-0 tender passenger locomotives are delivered to the Cape Government Railways from Neilson and Company and placed in passenger service out of Cape Town, East London and Port Elizabeth respectively.

References

History of South Africa